Walnut Cove is a town in Stokes County, North Carolina, United States. The population was 1,536 at the 2020 census.

It is the home of Family Pharmacy and the Walnut Cove Springfest, which draws many visitors to the area. Festival-organizers marked 1889, the town's incorporation date, but the town's roots date to the mid-18th century when it was known as Town Fork.  
Town Fork settlers formed a bond with Moravians in Bethania and Bethabara. Eventually, William Lash, a Moravian settler at Bethania, bought land along the Town Fork Creek, which later developed into a large plantation named Walnut Cove. 
The Town was a railroad center in its former years, and today remnants of the old Train Depot still stand on Depot Street.

It is also home to historic Covington House (built in 1821), Fulp-Marshall Home (built in 1836), Culler Roller Mill now known as Monitor Roller Mill (built in 1900).

Walnut Cove is also home to South Stokes High School. Belews Lake and Hanging Rock State Park are located nearby. It is also the hometown of rising sports announcer Matthew Owens who has served as the PA Announcer for South Stokes Football since 2017. Popular spots in and around Walnut Cove include Just Plain Country Store, Sam’s Pizza, El Cabo Mexican Restaurant, and nearby Belews Lake and Hanging Rock State Park. Winston-Salem is 23 miles to the southeast via Route 311, Route 158 and Salem Parkway (US-421). Danbury is 10 miles to the north via Highway 89. Germanton is 6.6 miles to the west-southwest via Highway 65. Madison and Mayodan are 14 miles to the northeast via US 311. Other nearby cities include Kernersville, Walkertown, Rural Hall, and the small community of Pine Hall.

History
The Christ Episcopal Church and Walnut Cove Colored School are listed on the National Register of Historic Places.

Geography
Walnut Cove is located at  (36.296225, -80.141150).

According to the United States Census Bureau, the town has a total area of 2.4 square miles (6.2 km), all of it land.

Demographics

2020 census

As of the 2020 United States census, there were 1,586 people, 802 households, and 493 families residing in the town.

2000 census
As of the census of 2000, there were 1,465 people, 585 households, and 374 families residing in the town. The population density was 608.5 people per square mile (234.7/km). There were 636 housing units at an average density of 264.2 per square mile (101.9/km). The racial makeup of the town was 79.39% White, 19.11% African American, 0.14% Native American, 0.14% Asian, 0.34% from other races, and 0.89% from two or more races. Hispanic or Latino of any race were 0.96% of the population.

There were 585 households, out of which 26.7% had children under the age of 18 living with them, 46.2% were married couples living together, 15.6% had a female householder with no husband present, and 35.9% were non-families. 32.6% of all households were made up of individuals, and 15.9% had someone living alone who was 65 years of age or older. The average household size was 2.24 and the average family size was 2.83.

In the town, the population was spread out, with 19.5% under the age of 18, 6.3% from 18 to 24, 24.6% from 25 to 44, 22.8% from 45 to 64, and 26.8% who were 65 years of age or older. The median age was 45 years. For every 100 females, there were 80.0 males. For every 100 females age 18 and over, there were 73.1 males.

The median income for a household in the town was $31,944, and the median income for a family was $41,250. Males had a median income of $31,953 versus $24,871 for females. The per capita income for the town was $16,117. About 8.3% of families and 12.5% of the population were below the poverty line, including 10.0% of those under age 18 and 17.8% of those age 65 or over.

References

External links
 Town of Walnut Cove official website
 South Stokes High School website

Towns in Stokes County, North Carolina
Towns in North Carolina